National Highway 220, commonly referred to as NH 220 is a national highway in  India. It is a spur road of National Highway 20. NH-220 traverses the states of Jharkhand and Odisha in India. Prior to new numbering system of national highways adopted in 2018, the current NH 183 in Kerala was referred to as NH 220.

Route 
Jharkhand
Chaibasa - Gobindpur - Hata - Odisha border .

Odisha
Jharkhand border - Tiringidihi - Rairangpur - Jashipur - Dhenkikot.

Junctions  

  Terminal near Chaibasa.
  near Jashipur.
  Terminal near Dhenkikot.

See also 

 List of National Highways in India
 List of National Highways in India by state

References

External links 

 NH 220 on OpenStreetMap

National highways in India
National Highways in Jharkhand
National Highways in Odisha